Love & Diane is a 2002 documentary film directed by Jennifer Dworkin about a recovering crack addict and her troubled daughter in New York City as they navigate the obstacles of joblessness, parenthood, welfare, and public housing.

References

External links

 

Love & Diane at Women Make Movies
Love & Diane at POV

2002 films
Documentary films about drugs
American documentary films
Documentary films about women
Documentary films about African Americans
2002 documentary films
Documentary films about homelessness in the United States
Documentary films about New York City
POV (TV series) films
Women in New York City
2000s American films